Zoran Đorđević (Serbian Cyrillic: Зоран Ђорђевић; born 13 February 1952) is a Serbian international football manager. During his 40-year career, he has coached many national and first-league teams across Asia and Africa.

Đorđević was the subject of the 2013 documentary Coach Zoran and His African Tigers, describing his attempts to give a head start to the recently formed South Sudan national football team.

Profile
Đorđević was the head coach of Bangladesh national football team with whom he became champion at the 2010 South Asian Games. He led Bangladesh to their first gold medal in 11 years at this competition, creating history by setting two new records: 4–0 victory vs. Afghanistan is the biggest winning margin in the final in the 26 year history of this competition and becoming champion without a single goal conceded in the tournament. Before this he was the head coach of Churchill Brothers SC in the Indian Professional League, the I-League. Đorđević was the first foreign coach to become champion of India when Churchill Brothers won the 2008–09 I-League, their first national league title in club history, after finishing as runners-up on four previous occasions. He is also the first foreigner to receive the prestigious S. A. Rahim Trophy for the best coach of the year from the All India Football Federation. FIFA and President Sepp Blatter sent a congratulatory letter to Đorđević for this achievement. Additionally he led the club to become state champions of Goa and reached qualification for the AFC Champions League for the first time.

National team coaching career
Head Coach of Bangladesh national football team at 2010 South Asian Games – 1st place, Gold Medal 
(5 matches played, 5 wins, 0 draws, 0 losses, 13 goals scored, 0 goals conceded, no red card)
Group Matches: Bangladesh 3–0 Nepal, Bangladesh 4–0 Bhutan, Bangladesh 1:0 Maldives, Semifinal: Bangladesh 1–0 India, Final: Bangladesh 4–0 Afghanistan
New record 4–0 victory in final of the competition – first gold medal for Bangladesh after 11 years
First time team becoming champion without a single goal conceded in tournament 26-year history

Head Coach of Sudan national football team for 2002 FIFA World Cup Korea/Japan – Qualifiers
Preliminary Playoff: (H) Sudan 1–0 Mozambique, (A) Mozambique 2–1 Sudan
(2–2 Sudan qualified on away goals rule for Group B with Nigeria, Ghana, Liberia, Sierra Leone)

Head Coach of Yemen national football team for 2000 AFC Asian Cup Lebanon – Qualifiers
(Best results: Yemen 3–0 Nepal, Yemen 11–2 Bhutan)

Đorđević was appointed head coach of the Philippines U-21's in January 2012.

Club coaching career

On 9 June 2007 Đorđević signed a contract with IPL club F.C. Zob Ahan for the 2007–08 season following the departure of Rasoul Korbekandi who resigned due to health issues. He was sacked in October 2007 following unsatisfactory results in the 2007–08 Iran Pro League season. Coach Đorđević removed from the starting lineup some experienced players who did not fit into his concept and promoted from the youth team a 17-year-old goalkeeper Mohammad Bagher Sadeghi and 16-year-old Mohsen Mosalman who became the youngest player ever to score a goal against Persepolis F.C. – the most successful and biggest club in Iran. His disagreements with the club management over player selection led to his departure from the club, claiming he wanted to build a champion team at a club which never finished higher than 5th position in the Iranian League. After coach Đorđević's departure, in the very next season Zob Ahan club won the national cup which was their second trophy in club history and narrowly lost the league on the final match of the season, finishing 2nd on goal difference. Many in Esfahan today praise ZĐorđević for his farsighted vision and his contribution of launching the careers of talented young players who reached the Iran national team. Tomislav Savic, the former goalkeeper coach of Atletico Madrid who was brought to the club by head coach Đorđević, received the best goalkeeper coach award in Iran in 2008–09 and still remains with the club into his fourth season.

On 5 February 2007 Đorđević was appointed head-coach of UAE 2nd Division side Al-Rams. In the first disastrous half of the 2006–07 season, the club was at the bottom of the standings with only one point and had not registered a single win (15 matches, 0 wins, 1 draw, 14 losses) which led to the dismissal of their Egyptian coach. After coach Zoran's arrival in mid-season, against all the odds he managed to revitalize the team (5 wins, 2 draws, 8 losses, 17 points). He created a sensational result when with the bottom club Al-Rams won 4–3 against the league leaders Ajman Club who were until then favourites for promotion to UAE Premier League.

2008–09 Churchill Brothers SC
 First Foreign Coach India League Champion
 First Foreigner to receive the Best Coach of the year award in India
 Received a congratulation letter from FIFA President Joseph Sepp Blatter for this unique achievement
 Qualification for AFC Champions League – First National League Title in Club history
 Goa Vodafone Pro-League Champion
 India Federation Cup semifinal, Super Cup final
 Churchill Brothers SC 9–1 victory over Vasco SC is the record biggest winning margin in I-League history

Coach Zoran and His African Tigers
During 2012, Đorđević was the subject of a documentary by British filmmaker Sam Benstead. The documentary looked at Đorđević's time as South Sudan national football team in which he led South Sudan to a 2-2 draw with Uganda in their inaugural FIFA recognised international friendly and their campaign in the 2012 CECAFA Cup.

References

External links
FIFA.com – Bengal Tigers roar again
FIFA.com – Young Brothers outlast their elders
the-AFC.com – Bangladesh are South Asian Games Champions
the-AFC.com – Afghanistan, Bangladesh in summit clash
the-AFC.com – SAF Games: Bangladesh, Maldives in last four
BFFonline – Djordjevic new Bangladesh coach
GULF NEWS – Coach Zoran makes a mark in debut for Churchill Brothers 
Sportal.rs – Srbin osvojio titulu u Indiji!
KURIR – Srbin osvojio Indiju 
GLAS – Zoran Đorđević prvi zvaničan kandidat za selektora Srbije!
MONDO – Djordjević se kandidovao za selektora Srbije

Video

Ђорђевић: Желим титулу светског шампиона, August 23, 2009

1952 births
Living people
People from Pirot
Serbian football managers
Serbian expatriate football managers
Expatriate football managers in the United Arab Emirates
Expatriate football managers in Kuwait
Expatriate football managers in Qatar
Al-Gharafa SC managers
Expatriate football managers in Iran
Expatriate football managers in Bahrain
Expatriate football managers in Saudi Arabia
Emirates Club managers
Zob Ahan Esfahan F.C. managers
Qatar SC managers
Al Ahli SC (Doha) managers
Al-Muharraq SC managers
Al-Wehda Club (Mecca) managers
Expatriate football managers in Yemen
Yemen national football team managers
Expatriate football managers in Sudan
Sudan national football team managers
Expatriate football managers in India
Expatriate football managers in Bangladesh
Bangladesh national football team managers
Expatriate football managers in Syria
Expatriate football managers in the Philippines
Expatriate football managers in South Sudan
South Sudan national football team managers
University of Belgrade alumni
Al-Sahel SC (Kuwait) managers
Serbia and Montenegro expatriate sportspeople in Kuwait
Serbian expatriate sportspeople in Syria
Serbian expatriate sportspeople in South Sudan
Serbian expatriate sportspeople in the Philippines
Serbian expatriate sportspeople in India
Serbian expatriate sportspeople in Bangladesh
Serbia and Montenegro expatriate sportspeople in Sudan
Serbia and Montenegro expatriate sportspeople in Yemen
Serbia and Montenegro expatriate sportspeople in Qatar
Yugoslav expatriate sportspeople in Bahrain
Serbia and Montenegro expatriate sportspeople in the United Arab Emirates
Serbian expatriate sportspeople in Iran
Serbia and Montenegro expatriate sportspeople in Saudi Arabia
Qadsia SC managers
Kuwait Premier League managers
Al-Fahaheel FC managers
Churchill Brothers FC Goa managers
Persian Gulf Pro League managers
Yugoslav expatriate sportspeople in the United Arab Emirates
Yugoslav football managers
Yugoslav expatriate football managers
Yugoslav expatriate sportspeople in Kuwait
Yugoslav expatriate sportspeople in Qatar